Andrew Boland (born March 30, 1972 in Leixlip) is an Irish slalom canoer who competed in the mid-1990s. He finished 40th in the K-1 eventat the 1996 Summer Olympics in Atlanta.

References
Sports-Reference.com profile

1972 births
Canoeists at the 1996 Summer Olympics
Irish male canoeists
Living people
Olympic canoeists of Ireland
20th-century Irish people